Denis Bećirović (born 28 November 1975) is a Bosnian politician, professor and historian who is the 8th and current Bosniak member of the Presidency of Bosnia and Herzegovina. Previously, he was a member of the national House of Peoples from 2019 to 2022. He is the current vice-president of the Social Democratic Party.

Born in Tuzla, Bećirović graduated from the city's University in 1998. He enrolled in postgraduate studies at the Faculty of Philosophy at the University of Sarajevo in 2000. Prior to his political engagement, Bećirović was a history teacher at a primary school in Tuzla. From 1998 to 2002, he worked at the Secondary School of Economics in his hometown.

Bećirović has been a member of the Social Democratic Party since 1993. In 1998, he became a member of the Federal Parliament. Two years later, he entered the Tuzla Cantonal Assembly and was appointed member of the Federal House of Peoples. At the 2006 general election, Bećirović was elected to the national House of Representatives. At the 2018 general election, he ran for a seat in the Presidency of Bosnia and Herzegovina as a Bosniak member, but was not elected. Following the general election, he became a member of the national House of Peoples.

At the 2022 general election, Bećirović ran once again for a seat in the Presidency as a Bosniak member and was elected, defeating former Presidency member Bakir Izetbegović. Bećirović was sworn in as Presidency member on 16 November 2022.

Education
Bećirović graduated in 1998 from the Faculty of Philosophy at the University of Tuzla. He enrolled in postgraduate studies at the Faculty of Humanities at the University of Sarajevo in 2000. He defended his master's thesis in 2004, and his doctorate in 2010 at the Faculty of Philosophy in Sarajevo.

Career
Bećirović joined the Social Democratic Party in 1993 and has held several positions within the party. Prior to his political engagement, Bećirović was a history teacher at a primary school in his hometown of Tuzla, and from 1998 to 2002, he worked at the Secondary School of Economics in his hometown. He has been an assistant professor at the Faculty of Philosophy in Tuzla since 2010. In 1998, Bećirović became a member of the Federal Parliament. Two years later, at the 2000 parliamentary election, he entered the Tuzla Cantonal Assembly and the Federal House of Peoples.

At the 2002 general election, Bećirović was re-elected to the Cantonal Assembly, and four years later, at the 2006 general election, he became a member of the national House of Representatives. He renewed his term at the 2010 general election as well. At the 2014 general election, Bećirović won his third consecutive term in the national Parliament.

At the 2018 general election, Bećirović ran for a seat in the Presidency of Bosnia and Herzegovina as a Bosniak member, but was not elected, obtaining 33.53% of the vote, with Šefik Džaferović of the Party of Democratic Action getting elected with 36.61% of the vote. In February 2019, following the election, Bećirović was appointed member of the national House of Peoples.

Presidency (2022–present)

2022 general election

The three-party liberal coalition of the Social Democratic Party, Our Party and the People and Justice party, also supported by the Union for a Better Future and the People's European Union, announced Bećirović's candidacy in the Bosnian general election on 21 May 2022, running once more for Presidency member and representing the Bosniaks.

At the general election, held on 2 October 2022, he was elected to the Presidency, having obtained 57.37% of the vote. The Party of Democratic Action candidate and former Bosniak Presidency member, Bakir Izetbegović, was second with 37.25%.

Domestic policy
Bećirović was sworn in as Presidency member on 16 November 2022, alongside newly elected member Željka Cvijanović and re-elected member Željko Komšić.

Personal life
Denis is married to Mirela Bećirović, and together they have two children. They live in Tuzla.

Works
Bećirović wrote several books and papers dealing with the modern history of Bosnia and Herzegovina. Some of his work include:

References

External links

Denis Bećirović at parlament.ba

1975 births
Living people
Politicians from Tuzla
Academic staff of the University of Tuzla
Academic staff of the University of Sarajevo
Bosniaks of Bosnia and Herzegovina
21st-century Bosnia and Herzegovina historians
Bosnia and Herzegovina politicians
Bosniak politicians
Social Democratic Party of Bosnia and Herzegovina politicians
Members of the House of Representatives (Bosnia and Herzegovina)
Chairmen of the House of Representatives (Bosnia and Herzegovina)
Members of the House of Peoples of Bosnia and Herzegovina
Members of the Presidency of Bosnia and Herzegovina